The 1991–92 NBA season was the Clippers' 22nd season in the National Basketball Association, and their 8th season in Los Angeles. During the off-season, the Clippers acquired Doc Rivers from the Atlanta Hawks, and James Edwards from the Detroit Pistons. The Clippers, led by Danny Manning and Ron Harper, won five of their first seven games. They would lose six straight afterwards, but then post an 8-game winning streak in December which led them to a 14–10 start. However, they would struggle over the next few weeks sliding back below .500 with a 21–24 record as head coach Mike Schuler was fired. After splitting two games under interim Mack Calvin, and holding a 22–25 record at the All-Star break, the team hired Larry Brown, who resigned as coach of the San Antonio Spurs a few weeks earlier.

Under Brown, the Clippers won 23 of their final 35 games to finish fifth in the Pacific Division with a 45–37 record. Making their first playoff appearance since the 1975–76 season when they were known as the Buffalo Braves, and ending a fifteen-year playoff drought. This season also marked the first time that the Clippers finished with a better record than their crosstown rival, the Los Angeles Lakers, who finished two games behind them with a 43–39 record.

Manning averaged 19.2 points, 6.9 rebounds, 1.6 steals and 1.5 blocks per game, while Harper averaged 18.2 points, 5.5 rebounds, 5.1 assists and 1.9 steals per game, and Charles D. Smith provided the team with 14.6 points, 6.2 rebounds and 2.0 blocks per game, but only played just 49 games due to a knee injury. In addition, Ken Norman averaged 12.1 points and 5.8 rebounds per game, while Rivers contributed 10.9 points, 3.9 assists and 1.9 steals per game, Olden Polynice provided with 8.1 points and 7.1 rebounds per game, and Gary Grant contributed 7.8 points, 6.9 assists and 1.8 steals per game. Edwards averaged 9.7 points per game off the bench, and second-year forward Loy Vaught provided with 7.6 points and 6.5 rebounds per game. Brown finished in fourth place in Coach of the Year voting.

However, in the Western Conference First Round of the playoffs, the Clippers lost in five games to the Utah Jazz. Following the season, Smith, Rivers and second-year guard Bo Kimble were all traded to the New York Knicks, while Edwards signed as a free agent with the Los Angeles Lakers, and Polynice was dealt to the Detroit Pistons.

Draft picks

Roster

Roster notes
 Forward Tony Brown became the 5th former Laker to play with the crosstown rival Clippers. He would later serve as an assistant coach for the team under coaches Mike Dunleavy, Sr. and Kim Hughes from 2008 to 2010
 This is point guard David Rivers's second tour of duty with the franchise. He previously played for the team in 1989–1990.

Regular season

Season standings

y – clinched division title
x – clinched playoff spot

z – clinched division title
y – clinched division title
x – clinched playoff spot

Record vs. opponents

Game log

Playoffs

|- align="center" bgcolor="#ffcccc"
| 1
| April 24
| @ Utah
| L 97–115
| Doc Rivers (23)
| Charles Smith (9)
| Doc Rivers (5)
| Delta Center19,911
| 0–1
|- align="center" bgcolor="#ffcccc"
| 2
| April 26
| @ Utah
| L 92–103
| Danny Manning (22)
| Ken Norman (14)
| Doc Rivers (6)
| Delta Center19,911
| 0–2
|- align="center" bgcolor="#ccffcc"
| 3
| April 28
| Utah
| W 98–88
| Danny Manning (17)
| Ron Harper (12)
| three players tied (5)
| Los Angeles Memorial Sports Arena14,086
| 1–2
|- align="center" bgcolor="#ccffcc"
| 4
| May 3
| Utah
| W 115–107
| Danny Manning (33)
| Danny Manning (10)
| Norman, Grant (6)
| Anaheim Convention Center7,148
| 2–2
|- align="center" bgcolor="#ffcccc"
| 5
| May 4
| @ Utah
| L 89–98
| Danny Manning (24)
| Ken Norman (10)
| Ron Harper (7)
| Delta Center19,911
| 2–3
|-

Player statistics

Season

Playoffs

Awards and records

Transactions
The Clippers were involved in the following transactions during the 1991–92 season.

Trades

Free agents

Additions

Subtractions

Player Transactions Citation:

References

Los Angeles Clippers seasons